The Best of Yankovic is a compilation album by "Weird Al" Yankovic, released exclusively in Korea in 1992 on the vinyl LP record format. Due to the fact that the album was released when CDs were dominant, the album is fairly rare. Half of the tracks are culled from what was the most recent Yankovic album at the time, Off the Deep End (1992).

Track listing
Side one 
"Smells Like Nirvana" (Kurt Cobain, Nirvana, "Weird Al" Yankovic) – 3:42
"I Was Only Kidding" (Yankovic) – 3:31
"Taco Grande" (Christian Carlos Warren, Gerardo Mejia, Yankovic) – 3:44
"Airline Amy" (Yankovic) – 3:50
"The Plumbing Song" (Frank Farian, B. Nail, Diane Warren, Yankovic) – 4:05

Side two 
"Eat It" (Michael Jackson, Yankovic) – 3:22
"Like a Surgeon" (Billy Steinberg, Tom Kelly, Yankovic) – 3:31
"Living with a Hernia" (Dan Hartman, Charlie Midnight, Yankovic) – 3:20
"Lasagna" (Yankovic) – 2:46
"One More Minute" (Yankovic) – 4:05

Tracks 1–5 from Off the Deep End (1992)
Track 6 from "Weird Al" Yankovic in 3-D (1984)
Tracks 7, 10 from Dare to Be Stupid (1985)
Track 8 from Polka Party! (1986)
Track 9 from Even Worse (1988)

References

"Weird Al" Yankovic compilation albums
1992 greatest hits albums
Scotti Brothers Records compilation albums